The Shire of Tingalpa was a local government area in the south-eastern suburbs of Brisbane, Queensland, Australia.

History

On 11 November 1879, the Tingalpa Division was created as one of 74 divisions within Queensland under the Divisional Boards Act 1879 with a population of 1,490.

However, the residents of Cleveland sought to be independent of the division and on 29 May 1885, Cleveland Division was separated from Tingalpa Division.

With the passage of the Local Authorities Act 1902, the Tingalpa Division became the Shire of Tingalpa on 31 March 1903.

On 1 October 1925, the shire lost areas west of the Tingalpa Creek to the new City of Brisbane.

Amalgamations in 1948
On 9 December 1948, as part of a major reorganisation of local government in South East Queensland, an Order in Council replacing ten former local government areas between the City of Brisbane and the New South Wales border with only four. The former ten were:
 Beaudesert
 Beenleigh
 Cleveland
 Coolangatta
 Coomera
 Nerang
 Southport
 Tamborine
 Tingalpa
 Waterford

The four resulting local government areas were:
 the new Redland Shire, an amalgamation of Cleveland and the northern part of Tingalpa (which later became Redland City)
 the new Shire of Albert, a merger of Beenleigh, Coomera, Nerang (except for the Burleigh Heads area), the southern part of Tingalpa and the eastern part of Waterford
 an enlarged Shire of Beaudesert, an amalgamation of Beaudesert and Tamborine with the western part of Waterford
 Town of South Coast, an amalgamation of the Towns of Southport and Coolangatta with the Burleigh Heads part of Nerang (which later became City of Gold Coast)

The Order came into effect on 10 June 1949, when the first elections were held.

Localities
 Mount Cotton
 Carbrook
 Daisy Hill
 Kingston
 Loganholme
 Loganlea
 Redland Bay
 Rochedale
 Slacks Creek
 Victoria Point
 Woodridge

Chairmen
 1880: Mr Greaves
 1890: Hans Heinrich Heinemann
 1927: August Stern
 Henry Heinemann (son of Hans Heinrich Heinemann)

References

Former local government areas of Queensland
1879 establishments in Australia
1949 disestablishments in Australia